Eve Babitz (May 13, 1943 – December 17, 2021) was an American visual artist and author best known for her semi-fictionalized memoirs and her relationship to the cultural milieu of Los Angeles.

Early life and education
Babitz was born in Hollywood, California, the daughter of Mae, an artist, and Sol Babitz, a classical violinist on contract with 20th Century Fox. Her father was of Russian Jewish descent and her mother had Cajun (French) ancestry. Babitz's parents were friends with the composer Igor Stravinsky, who was her godfather. She attended Hollywood High School.

Career 
In 1963, her first brush with notoriety came through Julian Wasser's iconic photograph of a nude, 20-year-old Babitz playing chess with the artist Marcel Duchamp on the occasion of his landmark retrospective at the Pasadena Art Museum. The show was curated by Walter Hopps, with whom Babitz was having an affair at the time. The photograph is described by the Smithsonian Archives of American Art as being "among the key documentary images of American modern art".

Babitz began her independent career as an artist, working in the music industry for Ahmet Ertegun at Atlantic Records, making album covers. In the late 1960s, she designed album covers for Linda Ronstadt, The Byrds, and Buffalo Springfield. Her most famous cover was a collage for the 1967 album Buffalo Springfield Again.

Her articles and short stories appeared in Rolling Stone, The Village Voice, Vogue, Cosmopolitan, and Esquire. She was the author of several books including Eve's Hollywood, Slow Days, Fast Company, Sex and Rage, Two By Two, L.A. Woman, and Black Swans. Transitioning to her particular blend of fiction and memoir beginning with Eve's Hollywood, Babitz's writing of this period is marked by the cultural scene of Los Angeles during that time, with numerous references to and interactions with the artists, musicians, writers, actors, and sundry other iconic figures that made up the scene in the 1960s, 1970s, and 1980s. Novelists Joseph Heller and Bret Easton Ellis were fans of her work, with the latter writing, "In every book she writes, Babitz’s enthusiasm for L.A. and its subcultures is fully displayed."

Despite her literary output, which drew frequent comparisons to Joan Didion and was critically acclaimed, much of the press about Babitz emphasized her various romantic associations with famous men. These include singer/poet Jim Morrison, artists (and brothers) Ed Ruscha and Paul Ruscha, and Hopps, the comedian and writer Steve Martin, the actor Harrison Ford, and the writer Dan Wakefield, among others. Ed Ruscha included her in Five 1965 Girlfriends (Walker Arts Center's Design Journal, 1970). Because of this, she has been likened to Edie Sedgwick, Andy Warhol's 1965 protégée at The Factory in New York City.

In Hollywood’s Eve: Eve Babitz and the Secret History of L.A., biographer Lili Anolik writes, "passing herself off as a groupie allowed Eve to infiltrate, edge into territory from which she'd otherwise have been barred." Reviewing this biography for The Nation, journalist Marie Solis wrote, "Babitz didn’t live a life free from patriarchy, but modern-day readers might surmise that she found a way to outsmart it. Despite her proximity as a Hollywood insider to the powerhouses of male celebrity, she rarely succumbed to their charms; instead, she made everyone play by her own rules."

In 1997, Babitz was severely injured while in her car when she accidentally dropped a lit match onto a gauze skirt, which ignited and melted her pantyhose beneath it. While her lower legs were protected by the sheepskin Ugg boots she was wearing, the accident caused life-threatening third-degree burns to over half of her body. Because she had no health insurance, friends and family organized a fund-raising auction to pay her medical bills. Friends and former lovers donated cash and artworks to help pay for her long recovery. Babitz became somewhat more reclusive after this incident, but was still willing to be interviewed on occasion. In a 2000 interview with Ron Hogan of Beatrice magazine, Babitz said, "I've got other books to do that I'm working on." When Hogan asked what those books would be about, Babitz replied: "One's fiction and the other's nonfiction. The nonfiction book is about my experiences in the hospital. The other's a fictionalized version of my parents' lives in Los Angeles, my father's Russian Jewish side and my mother's Cajun French side." These books had not been published .

Babitz died of Huntington's disease at Ronald Reagan UCLA Medical Center in Los Angeles on December 17, 2021, at age 78.

Resurgence
Babitz enjoyed a renaissance from 2010 due in part to the reissuing of much of her work by publishers including New York Review Books, Simon & Schuster and Counterpoint Press. In 2019, New York Review of Books published I Used to Be Charming, a previously uncollected selection of her essays. In The Paris Review, Molly Lambert wrote, "Babitz is at home anywhere, and everywhere she goes she finds the most interesting person, the weirdest place, the funniest throwaway detail. She makes writing seem effortless and fun, which any writer can tell you is the hardest trick of all." In a 2009 review of Eve's Hollywood, Deborah Shapiro called Babitz's voice "self-assured yet sympathetic, cheeky and voluptuous, but registering just the right amount of irony", adding, "reading West (and Fante and Chandler and Cain and the like) made me want to go to Los Angeles. Babitz makes me feel like I'm there."

The New York Public Library convened a 2016 panel on "The Eve Effect" that included actress Zosia Mamet and New Yorker writer Jia Tolentino. In 2017, Hulu announced it would be developing a comedy series based on Babitz's memoirs, a project led by Liz Tigelaar, Amy Pascal, and Elizabeth Cantillon.

In 2022, the Huntington Library in California announced that it had acquired Babitz's personal archive, which includes drafts, journals, photographs, and letters spanning 1943 to 2011.

Published works

Fiction
Publisher information relates to first publication only. Some of the books have been reissued.
 Eve's Hollywood (1974) New York, NY: Delacorte Press/S. Lawrence.  OCLC 647012057 
 Slow Days, Fast Company: The World, The Flesh, and L.A.: Tales (1977) New York, NY: Knopf/Random House.   
 Sex and Rage: Advice to Young Ladies Eager for a Good Time; a Novel (1979) New York, NY: Knopf.  OCLC 1001915515
 L.A. Woman (1982) New York, NY: Linden Press/Simon & Schuster.  OCLC 8110896
 Black Swans: Stories (1993) New York, NY: Knopf/Random House.  OCLC 27067318

Nonfiction
 Fiorucci, The Book (1980) New York, NY: Harlin Quist/Dial/Delacorte.  OCLC 900307237
 Two by Two: Tango, Two-step, and the L.A. Night (1999). New York, NY: Simon & Schuster.  OCLC 41641459
 I Used to Be Charming: The Rest of Eve Babitz (2019). New York, NY: New York Review of Books  OCLC 1100441110

Selected essays
 Roll Over Elvis: The Second Coming of Jim Morrison. Esquire, March 1991

References

External links
 
 
 Brubach, Holly. "L.A. Confidential" T: The New York Times Style Magazine. August 19, 2009.
 Gregory, Mollie, "A Slice of Hollywood : BLACK SWANS, By Eve Babitz" Los Angeles Times, September 26, 1993
 Johnson, Reed, "Eve Babitz Kicks Off LA '60s Art World Tribute" Los Angeles Times, August 4, 2011
  Li, Lucy, "Beyond Nude Chess: Eve Babitz Embodied Bygone L.A." toutfait: The Marcel Duchamp Studies Online Journal July 7, 2011
 Kakutani, Michiko, "Books of The Times; Los Angeles Middle Agers Fighting the Old Ennui," New York Times, October 1, 1993
 Eve Babitz: return of the LA woman The Guardian, November 8, 2016
 Official website

1943 births
2021 deaths
20th-century American essayists
20th-century American novelists
20th-century American women writers
21st-century American women
American people of French descent
American people of Russian-Jewish descent
American women essayists
American women journalists
American women novelists
Artists from Los Angeles
Deaths from Huntington's disease
Hollywood High School alumni
Neurological disease deaths in California
Writers from Los Angeles